Ulla Wiggen (born 1942) is a Swedish painter. Wiggen is known for her paintings that interpret electronic circuitry, integrated circuit dies and schematic diagrams. In the late 1960s she was also known for her figure paintings.

Early life and education
Wiggen was born in Stockholm in 1942. She studied at the Art Academy in Stockholm from 1962 to 1963, the Royal College of Art in Stockholm from 1967 to 1972, the Nordic Psychotherapeutic College from 1972 to 1974 and the Psychology Education Stockholm University from 1978 to 1986.

Collections
Her work is included in the collections of:
 the Moderna Museet, Stockholm,
 the Norrköping Art Museum, Sweden,
 the Göteborgs Museum of Art, Sweden,
 the Västerås Konstmuseum, Sweden, 
 the Gävle Museum, Sweden and 
 the Malmo Art Museum, Malmo, Sweden.

References

Swedish women artists
21st-century Swedish painters
20th-century Swedish painters
1942 births
Living people
Artists from Stockholm